Norman Bruce "Red" Edgerton (June 11, 1887 – June 16, 1925) was an American football coach, college athletics administrator, and physician. He served as the head football coach at the University of South Carolina at Columbia, South Carolina from 1912 to 1915, compiling a record of 19–13–3.  Edgerton was the athletic director at South Carolina during that same span.

Edgerton was born on June 11, 1887, in Fremont, North Carolina, and grew up in New Bern, North Carolina. He played college football at Davidson College in Davidson, North Carolina, before graduating in 1909. He then attended the Medical College of South Carolina—now known as the Medical University of South Carolina—in Charleston, South Carolina.

Edgerton died of pneumonia on June 16, 1925, at this home in Columbia, South Carolina.

Head coaching record

References

1887 births
1925 deaths
20th-century American physicians
Davidson Wildcats football players
South Carolina Gamecocks athletic directors
South Carolina Gamecocks football coaches
Medical University of South Carolina alumni
Sportspeople from New Bern, North Carolina
People from Wayne County, North Carolina
Coaches of American football from North Carolina
Players of American football from North Carolina
Physicians from South Carolina
Deaths from pneumonia in South Carolina